Patrick Flanagan (October 11, 1944 - December 19, 2019) was an American New Age author and inventor.

Flanagan wrote books focused on Egyptian sacred geometry and Pyramidology.

In 1958, at the age of 14, while living in Bellaire, Texas, Flanagan invented the neurophone, an electronic device that claims to transmit sound through the body’s nervous system directly to the brain. It was patented in the United States in 1968 (Patent #3,393,279). The invention earned him a profile in Life magazine, which called him a "unique, mature and inquisitive scientist."

Pyramid power

During the 1970s, Flanagan was a proponent of pyramid power. He wrote several books and promoted it with lectures and seminars. According to Flanagan, pyramids with the exact relative dimensions of Egyptian pyramids act as "an effective resonator of randomly polarized microwave signals which can be converted into electrical energy." One of his first books, Pyramid Power, was featured in the lyrics of The Alan Parsons Project album, Pyramid.

Inventions and discoveries
In 1958, at the age of 13, Flanagan invented a device which he called a Neurophone, which he claimed transmitted sound via the nervous system to the brain.

Bibliography

References

External links 
 PhiSciences Patrick Flanagan Official site

1944 births
Living people
American inventors
Pyramidologists
Sacred geometry